Anand Nagar metro station may refer to:

 Anand Nagar metro station, Mumbai
 Anand Nagar metro station, Pune